Ladies Branch is a stream in Vernon County in the U.S. state of Missouri. It is a tributary of the Osage River.

Ladies Branch, historically called Lady Branch, has the name of Wilton Lady, a pioneer citizen.

See also
List of rivers of Missouri

References

Rivers of Vernon County, Missouri
Rivers of Missouri